Ljubiša Stamenković (born 21 July 1964) is a Serbian football manager.

Playing career
Although born in Vlasotince, he spent almost whole his life in Smederevo, where he started playing for local club Železničar. Then he has moved to Belgrade for studies and joined OFK Beograd just to spend short time there. Most of his career he has played for, then lower league level clubs Smederevo and Mladi Radnik whose jerseys he has worn in several different occasions. At the end of playing career, he played for Balkan Mirijevo and Vranovo.

Coaching career
After retiring as a player, Stamenković has started working as an assistant coach with Velimir Ciga Đorđević.

Sevojno (2003–2006): First success
In the summer of 2003, then 39-year-old Piskavac took the job at then 3rd league club Sevojno. In his first season the club finished short in achieving promotion finished second, 11 points behind the promoted Mladost Lučani The following season the club achieved what they failed the previous season, promotion. In the 2005–06 season they found themselves in the second division and finished in a respectable 8th spot, thus avoiding relegation, which was the goal at the beginning of the season. That was undoubtedly his first successful period as a coach.

Mladenovac (2006–2007)
After leaving Sevojno, Stamenković returned to his old club Mladenovac which then played in the Serbian First League second highest tier in Serbian football. They finished in a solid 10th position and were 4 points short of promotion play-offs, the main reason being too many draws.

Bežanija (2007–2008): First job in the highest football rank of Serbia
Piskavac started the season as OFK Mladenovac coach but in October 2007 Bežanija, struggling in the Jelen SuperLiga with only one win, offered the job to Piskavac. His job was to help the club survive and avoid relegation. In the end he failed to achieve the survival in the league. Under his management the club only won four games and was relegated convincingly. This was the first time Stamenković managed in the top tier of Serbian football.

Sevojno and Sloboda Užice (2008–2014): Most successful period
Stamenković returned to the club in which he had his biggest success, Sevojno which also played in the Serbian First League, just so he could make the biggest success in history of the club, entering a Cup final, on the way beating Serbian giants Red Star and thus achieved UEFA Europa League qualifications. In the league, however, they were not that successful and finished 7th 4 points behind promotion.

The following season club started in the UEFA Europa League qualifications where his second division club has kicked out Lithuanian side FBK Kaunas, but next rival, French Lille was too strong and they lost 4–0 on aggregate. However, this season the club achieved promotion finishing 2nd in the First League and thus achieving the joy of playing in the highest rank of Serbian football.

That summer (2010) Sevojno and Sloboda Užice have merged. In his first full season in the elite rank Sloboda finished in 6th place and again being successful in the Serbian Cup reaching the semi-finals, but losing to Vojvodina 3–1 on aggregate.

In the 2011–12 season the club finished 5th and didn't achieve the Europa League qualifications on goal difference. That was also the highest ranking in the history of the club.

The 2012–13 season was the same as they finished 5th again.

On 26 October 2013, Stamenković coached his 100th SuperLiga game with Sloboda, against Javor at home. However, Sloboda lost 1–0.

On 6 November 2013, Stamenković, alongside Milovan Rajevac, was selected to be the head coach of the media selection team that would play Serbia national football team in a revival match in Užice. Media selected Piskavac because he is the longest serving coach in the Serbian SuperLiga and the first person to be in charge of a club for 100 games in the Serbian SuperLiga. Media selection team lost 2–0.

On 23 November 2013, Stamenković coached his 200th game since joining the club in 2008. Sloboda lost 4–1 to Red Star Belgrade. On 26 April 2014, Sloboda lost 4–0 to Jagodina at home, this being their biggest defeat at home under Stamenković. In the final round of the 2013–14 season, Sloboda lost to Voždovac 1–0 at home, and finished in 16th place therefore being relegated. At the end of the season Stamenković left Sloboda after four years with the club.

He managed FK Borac Čačak in the 2015–16 Serbian SuperLiga season.

Nickname
Stamenković is rarely mentioned after his full name, instead he is referred as "Piskavac" (Serbian word for whistler), the nickname that he has gained as a kid.

Education
Beside a coaching licence, Stamenković has a diploma from a Faculty of Organizational Sciences in University of Belgrade.

Attack after the match
On 13 April 2013, Stamenković's side Sloboda drew 2–2 with FK Vojvodina at Karađorđe Stadium in Novi Sad. After the match some unknown person hit Stamenković while he was going to the locker room. After the match a delegate said that Stamenković was indeed hit in the face but Stamenković denied it and said he only wanted to concentrate on football. After the investigation it was confirmed that Stamenković was hit and that the person who did it was in custody. Stamenković and the crowd had some exchanges during and after the game.

Honours

Manager
Sevojno
Runner up (1) 2008–09 Serbian Cup
Runner up (1) 2009–10 Serbian First League (gained promotion)

Statistics

As a manager

List of seasons
 UCL = UEFA Champions League
 UEL = UEFA Cup / UEFA Europa League

1 Third Qualifying Round
2 Second tier
3 Third tier

References

External links
 Profile and interview at Utakmica.rs (in Serbian)
 Profile at Srbijafudbal
 Nickname at sportal.rs (in Serbian)

1964 births
Living people
People from Vlasotince
Serbian footballers
OFK Beograd players
FK Smederevo players
FK Mladi Radnik players
FK Balkan Mirijevo players
Serbian football managers
FK Sloboda Užice managers
FK Napredak Kruševac managers
FK Borac Čačak managers
OFK Beograd managers
FK Smederevo managers
Association footballers not categorized by position